Bueno Arévalo Julio Fernando, also known as Julio Bueno, is a well-respected director, musical composer and musicologist born in Loja, Ecuador.

He was director of the prestigious Teatro Nacional Sucre located in the capital city of Quito.

References

External links
 Julio Bueno: 2.292 funciones presentadas, en seis años, por la Fundación Teatro
 LA MUSICA POPULAR DEL ECUADOR A PARTIR DE 1950

Living people
Year of birth missing (living people)